Joselito Velázquez Altamirano (born 30 September 1993) is a Mexican professional boxer. As an amateur he won gold medals at the 2011 and 2015 Pan American Games, and represented Mexico at the 2016 Olympics.

Early life
Velázquez was born in the city of Oaxaca, Mexico, but had to leave at the age of two because of his family's financial needs. He then moved with his family to Cancun, where he grew up. His father worked as a cab driver and a baker, while his mother worked at a daycare.

Velázquez was introduced to boxing through his older brother, who was a member of the Quintana Roo state boxing team. He decided to practice the sport after seeing his brother compete in a national tournament. Joselito also played soccer as a teenager. He was part of Cruz Azul's U-14 team. However, he could not make it to a professional level because of his slight build.

Amateur career
Velázquez was the Pan American Games gold medalist in 2011 and 2015 in the light flyweight category. He defeated Cuban amateur world champions Yosvany Veitía and Joahnys Argilagos in each competition's final match. Velázquez was the first athlete from Cancún to compete in the Olympic Games. Months before the 2016 Olympics, Velázquez suffered a dislocated shoulder that did not let him practice nor compete for two months. He was reportedly not healthy in the lead-up to the Olympics but he won the 2016 APB and WSB Olympic Qualifier to earn a spot. According to several analysts, he was part of the most talented generation of Mexican boxers at the amateur level. Velazquez won his first Olympic fight against Argentinian Leonardo Blanc. He'd lose in the next round against the eventual gold medalist, Uzbek Hasanboy Dusmatov.

As an amateur, Velázquez accrued a 138-40 record. Analysts see him as a technical boxer with speed in hands and legs, with ability to work in short distances. He's quoted Julio César Chávez as his role model.

Professional career
Velázquez turned professional in October 2016. He is represented by Teiken Promotions. His manager is Frank Espinoza and he is coached by Francisco Bonilla. Velázquez ran into some controversy in his 4th pro bout, as the referee incorrectly gave Erick Zamora a count following a low blow from Velázquez. The referee declared the contest a KO win for the former Olympian, as Zamora squirmed in the floor in pain.

Professional boxing record

References

External links

 
 

1993 births
Living people
Mexican male boxers
Olympic boxers of Mexico
Boxers at the 2016 Summer Olympics
Boxers at the 2011 Pan American Games
Boxers at the 2015 Pan American Games
Place of birth missing (living people)
Pan American Games medalists in boxing
Pan American Games gold medalists for Mexico
People from Cancún
Sportspeople from Quintana Roo
Light-flyweight boxers
Medalists at the 2011 Pan American Games
Medalists at the 2015 Pan American Games
21st-century Mexican people